Karlsruhe/Baden-Baden Airport  (German: Flughafen Karlsruhe/Baden-Baden) is the international airport of Karlsruhe, the second-largest city in the German state of Baden-Württemberg, and also serves the spa town of Baden-Baden. It is the state's second-largest airport after Stuttgart Airport, and the 18th-largest in Germany with 1,110,500 passengers as of 2016 and mostly serves low-cost and leisure flights.

The airport itself is part of Baden Airpark, a business park with numerous other tenants.

History

Early years as a military airport
The construction of a military airfield began in December 1951 in the Upper Rhine Plain between the Black Forest and the Rhine River under the supervision of the French Air Force. The runway and associated facilities were completed by June 1952. The airfield was granted to Canadian forces and became a military base, RCAF Station Baden–Soellingen, later renamed CFB Baden–Soellingen, from 1953 until 1994.

The newly founded Baden Airpark GmbH took over the former military airfield to develop it into a regional airport and business park. Technically, the airport itself today is part of the Baden Airpark, which also includes business facilities.

Public operations
The first commercial flight from Hapag-Lloyd Flug (now TUI fly Deutschland) took place in April 2001 with service to Palma de Mallorca and Ibiza. In 2008 the airport counted over one million passengers within a year for the first time.

On 25 October 2011, Ryanair announced it would open its 47th base at Karlsruhe/Baden-Baden in March 2012 with two based aircraft and 20 routes. In addition to Ryanair's then existing 12 routes Ryanair opened seven additional routes to Faro, Málaga, Palma, Riga, Thessaloniki, Vilnius and Zadar. In July 2018, TUI fly Deutschland announced that it would terminate its operations at the airport, cancelling seven year-round and seasonal leisure routes to the Canaries and the Mediterranean.

Facilities
Karlsruhe/Baden-Baden Airport consists of one passenger terminal building equipped with 20 check-in counters and eight departure gates as well as some shops and restaurants. The apron features eight aircraft stands of which most can be used by mid-sized aircraft such as the Boeing 737. Due to the location of the terminal building walk stands and buses are used for boarding.

Airlines and destinations
The following airlines operate regular scheduled and charter flights at Karlsruhe/Baden-Baden Airport:

Statistics

Ground transportation
The airport can be reached via motorway A5 which leads from Hesse to Basel (Exit Baden-Baden). There are local bus connections to Baden-Baden and Rastatt as well as their respective train stations.

See also
 Transport in Germany
 List of airports in Germany

References

External links

 Official website
 
 

Airports established in 1952
Airports in Baden-Württemberg
Buildings and structures in Baden-Württemberg
Rastatt (district)
Companies based in Baden-Württemberg
Companies based in Karlsruhe